Isoberlinia doka is a hardwood tree native to African tropical savannas and Guinean forest-savanna mosaic dry forests where it can form single species stands.  The tree is exploited for its economic value as a commercial timber.  The leaves and shoots of the tree dominate the diet of the Giant Eland in its range.  The tree is a host plant for Anaphe moloneyi (superfamily Thaumetopoeidae), one of the caterpillars that produces a wild silk, sayan, local to parts of Nigeria.

References

External links

Detarioideae
Flora of West Tropical Africa
Flora of West-Central Tropical Africa
Flora of Northeast Tropical Africa
Miombo
Trees of Africa
Flora of Uganda
Taxa named by William Grant Craib
Taxa named by Otto Stapf